The Congress Hall is the Government House in Ufa, built for the 450th anniversary of the accession of Bashkortostan to Russia.

Its architecture is characterized by the use of spatial, formal, coloristic prototypes of Bashkir culture for the formation of a modern national architecture. The epitome of this style became glazed facade with Bashkir ornament, looking at the Belaya River.

The BRICS summit was held in Congress Hall in 2015.

See also
Republic House, Bashkortostan

References

External links
 Congress Hall website

Buildings and structures in Ufa
Government buildings in Russia